Joe Cooper (born January 22, 1979) is a former American football linebacker who played one season with the Calgary Stampeders of the Canadian Football League. He played college football at Ohio State University and attended Independence High School in Columbus, Ohio. He was also a member of the New York Jets and St. Louis Rams of the National Football League.

College career
Cooper played for the Ohio State Buckeyes from 1998 to 2001. He enrolled at Ohio State University in the fall of 1997 but was not eligible to play football that season. He earned All-Big Ten and Associated Press Third Team All-American honors in 2000 after recording 80 tackles. Cooper was also co-captain of the team in 2000 and 2001. He was voted the most inspirational player of the Buckeyes by his teammates while also being named the team's most outstanding linebacker by his coaches in 2000.

Professional career

New York Jets
Cooper was signed by the New York Jets on April 24, 2002 after going undrafted in the 2002 NFL Draft. He was released by the Jets on September 1, 2002.

Calgary Stampeders
Cooper played in three games, starting all three, for the Calgary Stampeders in 2002.

St. Louis Rams
Cooper signed with the St. Louis Rams on January 7, 2003. He was released by the Rams on July 22, 2003.

References

External links
Just Sports Stats
College stats
NFL Draft Scout

Living people
1979 births
Players of American football from Columbus, Ohio
American football linebackers
Canadian football linebackers
African-American players of American football
African-American players of Canadian football
Ohio State Buckeyes football players
Calgary Stampeders players
Players of Canadian football from Columbus, Ohio
21st-century African-American sportspeople
20th-century African-American sportspeople